Pano Deftera is a village 11 km south-west of Nicosia in Cyprus. Pano Deftera was the home of the well-known Eramian family, an Armenian-Cypriot family that came to Cyprus in 1768 and its descendants are spread around the world. The history of the family is documented in Joy Kouyoumdjian's book The Agha's Children.

References

Communities in Nicosia District